Villaguay is a city in the province of Entre Ríos in the Argentine Mesopotamia. It has about 49,000 inhabitants as of the census 2010 and is the head town of the department of the same name.

The city lies near the geographic center of the province, east of the Gualeguay River, on National Route 18 (which links it to Paraná, the provincial capital, located 155 km to the west, and to Concordia, 120 km east).

The earliest records of European settlement date to 1790. In the nineteenth century, Spanish, Jewish, French, Italian, Volga German, and Belgian communities were established in the area. In 1873, Villaguay, previously administered by military commanders, became a municipality.

References

 OpenStreetMap - Villaguay
 
 Villaguay.net - Portal of the city.
 Villaguayguia.com - Portal of the city.
 TurismoEntreRios.com - Tourism portal of the province of Entre Ríos.

Populated places in Entre Ríos Province
Cities in Argentina
Argentina
Entre Ríos Province